Telangana Secretariat situated at Hyderabad, is the administrative office of the employees of the Government of Telangana in India. The Telangana government on 15 September 2022 has decided to name the new Secretariat complex as Dr. B. R. Ambedkar Telangana Secretariat.

History
The old secretariat had an old Nizam period heritage structure called as Peshi or G-block. After the bifurcation of Andhra Pradesh to form the new state of Telangana, the building were divided into 58:42 for AP and Telangana for 10 years, until 2024.

The razing of old Secretariat complex of Telangana began in Hyderabad early in July 2020, with the government starting demolition of the old buildings and paving the way for construction of a state-of-the-art new complex in its place. Built in Indo-Sarssenic style, the new Telangana Secretariat also blends the Indo-Islamic architectural features generally with domes.

Departments
The secretariat has various following departments based on the rules of business, from which the business of state governance is transacted. The official head of the each department is the secretary to government.

 Agriculture and Co-operation
 Animal Husbandry and Fisheries
 Backward Classes Welfare
 Consumer Affairs Food & Civil Supplies
 Endowments
 Energy
 Environment, Forests, Science and Technology
 Finance
 General Administration
 Health, Medical & Family Welfare
 Higher Education
 Home
 Housing
 Industries and Commerce
 Information and Public Relations
 Information Technology, Electronics and Communications
 Infrastructure and Investment
 Irrigation and CAD
 Labour, Employment Training and Factories
 Law
 Minorities Welfare
 Municipal Administration & Urban Development
 Panchayat Raj and Rural Development
 Planning
 Public Enterprises
 Revenue
 Roads and Buildings
 School Education
 Social Welfare
 Transport
 Women, Children, Disabled and Senior Citizens
 Youth Advancement, Tourism and Culture

References 

Administrative headquarters of state governments in India
Government buildings in Telangana